Ozzano may refer to two places in Italy:
 Ozzano dell'Emilia, a town and municipality in the Province of Bologna, Emilia-Romagna
 Ozzano Monferrato, a village and municipality in the Province of Alessandria, Piedmont, Italy